For the color, see Khaki

Khahki-ye Chitab (also Romanized as khahkī-ye Chītāb) is a village in Kabgian Rural District, Kabgian District, Dana County, Kohgiluyeh and Boyer-Ahmad Province, Iran. At the 2006 census, its population was 19, in 7 families.

References 

Populated places in Dana County